The following articles cover the timeline of United States inventions:

Timeline of United States inventions (before 1890),  before the turn of the century
Timeline of United States inventions (1890–1945), before World War II
Timeline of United States inventions (1946–1991), for the post-war era
Timeline of United States inventions (after 1991), after the Fall of the Soviet Union

United States inventions
United States